Norman Knight (10 December 1946 – 22 April 2010) was a South African cricketer. He played in 36 first-class and 5 List A matches for Border from 1966/67 to 1974/75.

See also
 List of Border representative cricketers

References

External links
 

1946 births
2010 deaths
South African cricketers
Border cricketers
Cricketers from Port Elizabeth